Mary K. Meany (October 6, 1897 – October 12, 2000) was an American politician and educator.

Born in Clayton, Illinois, Meany graduated from Northwestern University in 1919 and then married Robert E. Meany who was a vice-president for William Wrigley Jr. Company. She taught English and music in the New York City, New York and Sheldon, Illinois public schools. Meany lived in Chicago, Illinois and was involved with the Women's Civic Club of Chicago and the Republican Party. Meany served in the Illinois House of Representatives from 1965 to 1969. She died from pneumonia at the Washington and Jane Smith Home in Chicago, Illinois.

References

1897 births
2000 deaths
People from Adams County, Illinois
Politicians from Chicago
Northwestern University alumni
Educators from Illinois
American women educators
Women state legislators in Illinois
Republican Party members of the Illinois House of Representatives
American centenarians
Deaths from pneumonia in Illinois
Women centenarians
20th-century American politicians
20th-century American women politicians